Francesco Simonetta (died 1612) was a Roman Catholic prelate who served as Bishop of Foligno (1606–1612) and Apostolic Nuncio to Poland (1606–1612).

Biography
Francesco Simonetta was born in Milan, Italy. On 17 July 1606, he was appointed during the papacy of Pope Paul V as Bishop of Foligno.
On 23 July 1606, he was consecrated bishop by Girolamo Bernerio, Cardinal-Bishop of Albano, with Galeazzo Sanvitale, Archbishop Emeritus of Bari-Canosa, and Alessandro Guidiccioni (iuniore), Bishop of Lucca, serving as co-consecrators. 
On 16 September 1606, he was appointed Apostolic Nuncio to Poland. 
He served as Bishop of Foligno until his death in 1612.

References

External links and additional sources
 (for Chronology of Bishops) 
 (for Chronology of Bishops) 
 (for Chronology of Bishops) 
 (for Chronology of Bishops) 

17th-century Italian Roman Catholic bishops
Bishops appointed by Pope Paul V
1612 deaths
Bishops of Foligno